Rear-Admiral John F. Newton  is a retired Royal Canadian Navy officer and now liaison officer with Veterans Affairs Canada.

He joined the Navy in 1983  after graduating as a geologist from Dalhousie University. He commanded  from 2003 until 2006.

In 2008 he took command of Canadian Forces Base Halifax. In 2010 he was appointed director general of naval personnel and promoted to commodore.

He was appointed Commander Maritime Forces Atlantic in July 2013. In 2017 he took up a post as liaison officer with Veterans Affairs Canada.

On June 4, 2018, he retired from the Canadian Armed Forces.

Awards and decorations
Newton's personal awards and decorations include the following:

108px

 CDS Commendation 
 Command Commendation

References

Canadian admirals
Royal Canadian Navy officers
Living people
Commanders of the Order of Military Merit (Canada)
Recipients of the Meritorious Service Decoration
Year of birth missing (living people)